Belarus has participated in the Turkvision Song Contest 3 times since its debut in . Details regarding the Belarusian broadcaster which organises Belarus' entry are unknown. In 2013, Belarus' first entry at Turkvision, Gunesh Abasova, qualified from the semi-final, and placed 2nd in the final achieving 205 points.

History

Belarus made their debut in the Turkvision Song Contest at the 2013 contest, in Eskişehir, Turkey. On 3 November 2013, it was announced that Gunesh Abasova would be representing Belarus in the contest. Abasova performed the song "Son Hatıralar". 

Belarus did not participate in the 2014 contest, the reason for its withdrawal is not known. Although they would make their return at the 2015 contest on 28 November 2015. On 30 November it was announced that Aleksandra Kazimova would represent Belarus in Istanbul. On 13 December 2015 it was revealed that Aleksandra Kazimova would perform the song "Azadlıq" in Istanbul. In the final, Kazimova placed 20th with 126 points.

On 18 May 2016 it was confirmed that Belarus would participate in Turkvision 2016.  would have participated in the contest with the Azerbaijani-language song "Məni anla", but the contest was cancelled.

Agarval was reselected for the 2020 contest, and participated with "Məni anla". At the contest, she placed 23rd with 166 points.

Participation overview

See also 
 Belarus in the Eurovision Song Contest
 Belarus in the Junior Eurovision Song Contest

References 

Turkvision
Countries in the Turkvision Song Contest